USS Hampton (SSN-767), a , is the fourth ship of the United States Navy to bear this name. The earlier Hamptons were given their names for varying reasons, but SSN-767 was specifically named for four cities: Hampton, Virginia; Hampton, Iowa; Hampton, South Carolina; and Hampton, New Hampshire. There are 14 more "Hampton" towns in the United States.

The contract to build the Hampton was awarded to the Newport News Shipbuilding and Dry Dock Company in Newport News, Virginia (adjacent to the aforementioned Hampton, Va.) on 6 February 1987, and her keel was laid down on 2 March 1990. She was launched on 3 April 1992, sponsored by Mrs. Laura Bateman, and she was commissioned on 6 November 1993, with Commander David Antanitus in command.

In late April 2004 Hampton along with  surfaced through the ice together at the North Pole.

In February 2007, Hampton left Norfolk, Virginia for a seven-month Western Pacific (WESTPAC) deployment. She traveled through the Panama Canal and arrived in Yokosuka, Japan. She completed two missions of national importance, and participated in two major, multinational naval exercises. She made port visits in Apra Harbor, Guam, White Beach, Okinawa, and Brisbane, Australia, as well as a brief stop in Pearl Harbor, Hawaii, before arriving in San Diego, CA. She earned the Navy Expeditionary Medal during this time.

On 17 September 2007, the Hampton's homeport was changed from Norfolk to San Diego, in a change from the Atlantic Fleet to the Pacific Fleet.

In an isolated incident from her safe operational record, in October 2007, six naval personnel were disciplined for fraudulently documenting the chemistry records of the Hampton's nuclear propulsion plant. Shortly thereafter, the ship's commanding officer Commander Michael B. Portland was also relieved of his command because of a loss of confidence in his leadership, but he has not been charged with any offense. In March 2008, the US Navy revealed that a total of 11 officers and enlisted men had been disciplined in connection with the fraudulent documentation and for cheating on qualification tests. In addition to the Captain, the submarine's engineer officer, the engineering department master chief petty officer, and the entire reactor laboratory division were dismissed from Naval nuclear plant duty and submarine service. No damage was discovered in the reactor core and the submarine has returned to operational status.

USS Hampton completed a Western Pacific deployment from 17 October 2008 to 17 April 2009. She made port visits to Singapore, Yokosuka, Japan, Saipan, and Apra Harbor, Guam, before returning to home port in San Diego. She participated in the first submarine exercise between the United States and the Singapore Navy.

In 2010 and 2011, the USS Hampton won the Submarine Squadron 11 Battle Efficiency award.

On 15 May 2011, the submarine visited Hong Kong.

Image gallery

External links 

 USS Hampton official home page
 Hampton fact sheet

References 

Los Angeles-class submarines
Hampton, USS
1992 ships
Submarines of the United States
Ships built in Newport News, Virginia